The Erkan Chen Residence is a former residence in Erkan Village, Xiyu Township, Penghu County, Taiwan belongs to the Chen family.

History
The residence was built in 1910 by brother Chen Ling and Chen Bang with the cost around NT$8,000 to 9,000.

Architecture
The residence was built with the classic southern Fujian style, featuring relief carvings, windows, doors and eaves. It forms a rectangular shape over an area of 330 m2 which includes three halls.

See also
 List of tourist attractions in Taiwan

References

1910 establishments in Taiwan
Houses completed in 1910
Houses in Taiwan
Tourist attractions in Penghu County